In mathematics, a Zinbiel algebra or dual Leibniz algebra is a module over a commutative ring with a bilinear product satisfying the defining identity:

The name was proposed by Jean-Michel Lemaire as being "opposite" to Leibniz algebra.

In any Zinbiel algebra, the symmetrised product

is associative.

A Zinbiel algebra is the Koszul dual concept to a Leibniz algebra.  The free Zinbiel algebra over V is the tensor algebra with product

where the sum is over all  shuffles.

References

 
   
 

Lie algebras
Non-associative algebras
Algebra of random variables